To Be Frank is the sixth solo studio album by the English singer-songwriter Nik Kershaw. The album was released in 2001 (in the UK), and 2002 (in the US) on Koch Records. The only single released from this album was "Wounded", which peaked at #100, on the UK singles chart.

Critical reception
Reviewing for AllMusic, critic Jason D. Taylor wrote of the album "Feeling more like a last plea to rekindle the success of his past rather than an attempt at something new, To Be Frank is a faceless collection of material that leaves you wondering if anyone even cares anymore." Reviewing for PopMatters, critic David Medsker wrote of the album "He’s older, wiser, but most importantly, he’s better. Alter egos and multiple personalities aside, To Be Frank is one of the most focused records Kershaw’s ever done."

Track listing
All songs written and composed by Nik Kershaw, unless otherwise indicated.

"Wounded" – 4:21
"Get Up" – 4:11
"Die Laughing" – 4:39
"Jane Doe" (Chesney Hawkes, Kershaw) – 4:22
"How Sad"  – 4:16
"Take Me to the Church" – 4:54
"Hello World" – 4:20
"Already" – 5:13
"One Day" – 5:07
"All Is Fair" – 4:13
"Show Them What You're Made Of" – 4:17

Singles
 Wounded UK #100

1. Wounded (Single Edit) [3:37]
2. They Said [4:30]
3. Food for Fantasy [4:26]

References

Nik Kershaw albums
2002 albums
E1 Music albums
Britpop albums